The Rubia Gallega, is a breed of cattle native to the autonomous community of Galicia in north-western Spain. It is raised mainly for meat. It is distributed throughout Galicia, with about 75% of the population concentrated in the province of Lugo. The coat may be red-blond, wheaten, or cinnamon-coloured.

History 

A herdbook was established in 1933. In the 20th century, some crossbreeding occurred with the Portuguese Barrosã, Swiss Braunvieh, Simmental, and British Shorthorn breeds.

At the end of 2015, the total registered Rubia Gallega population was 39,971, of which almost all were in Galicia. The breed is distributed throughout the autonomous community, with about 75% of the population concentrated in Lugo.

Use 

The Rubia Gallega is primarily a beef cattle breed. The milk is used in the production of Tetilla cheese, which has had Denominación de Origen certification since 1993 and European DOP certification since 1996. The Rubia Gallega has a tranquil temperament and is suitable for draught work; however, it is slow in comparison to oxen of other breeds.

References

Cattle breeds
Cattle breeds originating in Spain
Galicia (Spain)